Glamorgan-Spring Bay Council is a local government body in Tasmania, situated on the central east coast of the state. Glamorgan-Spring Bay is classified as a rural local government area and has a population of 4,528, the major towns of the region include Bicheno, Orford and Triabunna with Swansea the principal town.

History and attributes
Glamorgan-Spring Bay was established on 2 April 1993 after the amalgamation of the Municipality of Glamorgan and Municipality of Spring Bay. The council derives its name from the region of Glamorgan in Wales. Glamorgan-Spring Bay is classified as rural, agricultural and medium (RAM) under the Australian Classification of Local Governments.

The Maria Island and Freycinet national parks are contained in the region.

Suburbs

Not in above list
 Douglas River
 Freycinet Peninsula
 Maria Island
 Nugent
 Runnymede
 Schouten Island
 Tooms Lake
 Woodsdale

See also
List of local government areas of Tasmania

References

External links

Glamorgan-Spring Bay Council official website
Local Government Association Tasmania
Tasmanian Electoral Commission - local government

Local government areas of Tasmania
Glamorgan–Spring Bay Council